Al‐Malik Al‐Ashraf (Mumahhid Al‐Din) Umar Ibn Yūsuf Ibn Umar Ibn Alī Ibn Rasul, known as Umar Ibn Yusuf (1296) was the third Rasulid sultan, who ruled as Al-Asharaf Umar II. He was also a mathematician, astronomer and physician.

Biography 
Few biographical details about Al‑Malik al‑Ashraf ‘Umar are known. He was born in 1242 in Yemen, and he died in 1296.  He excelled in astronomy, agriculture, veterinary science and medicine.

Al‑Ashraf ruled for as the third Rasulid sultan for 21 months from 1295, succeeding after the end of the 46-year rule of his father, . According to the historian David King. In 1266 he commanded a military raid on the Yemenese city of Hajjah. He was in charge of the highland city of Sanaa, now the capital of Yemen. For a period al‑Ashraf ruled as governor of the flood‑irrigated lands near al‑Mahjam, which was owned by his family.

Family

Al‑Ashraf had six adults sons. Two of his daughters married sons of his younger brother and successor, al-Mu'ayyad Da'ud.

Data from the Encyclopaedia of Islam (1986)

Astronomical work

His works on astronomy contain information on earlier sources.

In a treatise about astrolabes and sundials, al-Ashraf included information on the construction of a compass bowl. He then uses the compass to determine the north point, the meridian, and the  towards Mecca. This is the first mention of a compass in a medieval Islamic scientific text and its earliest known use as a  indicator, although al-Ashraf did not claim to be the first to use it for this purpose.

Al‑Ashraf astronomical treatise includes the names of local Yemeni star names.

Treatise on agriculture
Al-Ashraf's  is considered by the historian David King to be crucial for constructing the history of agriculture during the Rasulid era. The work, of which two copies are extant, is the earliest Rasulid treatise about agriculture. The exact title is not known.

The text would have been primarily of use to Yemenese farmers and landowners; there is evidence that Al-Ashraf obtained some of his information from other lands, although no other texts are mentioned.

Notes

References

Sources
 
 
  (PDF version)

Further reading

 
 
 
 
 
 
 

1242 births
1296 deaths
13th-century Arabs
13th-century astronomers
Astronomers of the medieval Islamic world
Yemeni astronomers
Monarchs of Yemen
13th-century rulers in Asia
Rasulid dynasty